Speak to Me of Love (French: Parlez-moi d'amour) is a 1935 French comedy film directed by René Guissart and starring Roger Tréville, Germaine Aussey and Paule Andral.

The film's sets were designed by the art directors Henri Ménessier and René Renoux.

Partial cast
 Roger Tréville 
 Germaine Aussey
 Paule Andral 
 Julien Carette as Wolff  
 Jean Debucourt as Raymond Valtier  
 Suzanne Henri 
 Jane Loury
 Elise Maillé 
 Paul Pauley as Le duc de Rocheterre

References

Bibliography 
 Dayna Oscherwitz & MaryEllen Higgins. The A to Z of French Cinema. Scarecrow Press, 2009.

External links 
 

1935 films
French comedy films
1935 comedy films
1930s French-language films
Films based on works by Louis Verneuil
Films directed by René Guissart
French black-and-white films
1930s French films